Pakistan Hindu council is the representative body of all Hindus of Pakistan which was formed in the year 2005 by Ramesh Kumar Vankwani.

History
The Pakistan Hindu Council was founded by the  Ramesh Kumar Vankwani, Hindu activist and member of the National Assembly of Pakistan. It was registered in 2005.

Mission and Organization
The Pakistan Hindu Council represents the Pakistani Hindu community on social and political issues and aims to protect the basic rights and freedoms, especially of worship and assembly, of Hindus all over Pakistan.

PHC schools
Currently, Pakistan Hindu Council is running 17 schools across Tharparkar District, where as many as 1200 students are getting an education.

Mass wedding
The Pakistan Hindu Council organises mass wedding for poor Hindu couples annually. Around 1,100 couples have tied the knot through these ceremonies over the last eleven years.

Governing body
The governing body has 15 seats, contested by the Hindus all over the Pakistan.

Minority Rights

The council champions the Hindu's minority rights and it has been in the news for raising these issues including against the kidnapping, rape and forced conversions of Hindu girls.

Collaboration
The Pakistan Hindu Council actively seeks cooperation of other like-minded organizations and individuals to protect minorities's rights and raise awareness.

With the technical assistance of the Press Network of Pakistan, an Islamabad-based media house, a nationwide photo contest has been organized under the subject "All Pakistan Minorities Heritage Photo Contest" seeking photos from Pakistani nationals related to Non-Muslim religious heritage sites of worship, including Hindu, Christian, Sikh, Budh, Jain, Parsi and others.

See also

Dalit Sujag Tehreek
Hinduism in Pakistan
Hindu and Buddhist architectural heritage of Pakistan
Pakistan Hindu Panchayat
Evacuee Trust Property Board
List of Hindu temples in Pakistan
Shri Hinglaj Mata temple

References

External links 
 

Hindu organisations based in Pakistan
Religious organizations established in 2005
Hindu organizations established in the 21st century